
Gmina Nowiny (1973-2020: Gmina Sitkówka-Nowiny) is a rural gmina (administrative district) in Kielce County, Świętokrzyskie Voivodeship, in south-central Poland.

The gmina contains part of the protected area called Chęciny-Kielce Landscape Park.

Villages
Gmina Nowiny contains the villages and settlements of Bolechowice, Kowala, Nowiny, Sitkówka, Słowik, Szewce, Trzcianki, Wola Murowana, Zagrody, Zawada and Zgórsko.

Neighbouring gminas
Gmina Nowiny is bordered by the city of Kielce and by the gminas of Chęciny, Morawica and Piekoszów.

References

 Polish official population figures 2006

Nowiny
Gmina Nowiny